Leandra Wiloma Smeda (pronounced Schmeda; born 22 July 1989) is a South African soccer player who plays as a winger for South Africa women's national team.

On 10 November 2019, Smeda played her 100th match for South Africa against Japan.

References

External links
 

1989 births
Living people
South African women's soccer players
People from Bergrivier Local Municipality
Women's association football wingers
University of the Western Cape alumni
South Africa women's international soccer players
Olympic soccer players of South Africa
Footballers at the 2012 Summer Olympics
Footballers at the 2016 Summer Olympics
Gintra Universitetas players
South African expatriate soccer players
South African expatriate sportspeople in Lithuania
Expatriate women's footballers in Lithuania
Damallsvenskan players
Vittsjö GIK players
2019 FIFA Women's World Cup players
FIFA Century Club